Scinax crospedospilus is a species of frog in the family Hylidae.
It is endemic to Brazil.
Its natural habitats are subtropical or tropical moist shrubland, subtropical or tropical seasonally wet or flooded lowland grassland, subtropical or tropical high-altitude grassland, freshwater marshes, intermittent freshwater marshes, pastureland, heavily degraded former forest, ponds, and canals and ditches.

References

crospedospilus
Endemic fauna of Brazil
Amphibians described in 1925
Taxonomy articles created by Polbot